Winged serpent or Winged Serpent may refer to:

Legendary creatures
 Amphiptere, a type of winged serpent found in European heraldry
 Feathered Serpent, a Mesoamerican deity
 Lindworm, a legendary creature sometimes depicted as a winged serpent
 Wyvern, another legendary creature sometimes depicted as a winged serpent

Creative works
 Winged Serpent (Sliding Quadrants), a 1985 album by Cecil Taylor
 Q – The Winged Serpent, a 1982 fantasy-horror film
 Cry of the Winged Serpent, a 2007 horror-action film
 The Vengeance of the Winged Serpent, a 1984 French comedy film

See also 
 Flying serpent (disambiguation)